James Houston (born 28 December 1982) is an English former rugby league footballer who played in the 2000s and 2010s.

He has played at representative level for Scotland in 2003.

References

External links
Profile at Rugby League Project

1982 births
Living people
English people of Scottish descent
English rugby league players
Featherstone Rovers players
Hunslet R.L.F.C. players
Rugby articles needing expert attention
Rugby league locks
Rugby league props
Scotland national rugby league team players
York City Knights players